Shmuel Levi (March 14, 1884 – July 1966) was an Israeli painter.

Biography 
Shmuel Levi (Ophel)  was born in Sofia, Bulgaria. The name Opal was added by him as a pen name, yet at some point Levi abandoned it. His artwork stressed the Orientalist style especially seen by the Yemenite Jews.

His parents were Abraham and Naomi Levi. After completing his studies in gymnasia, he began his studies at the National Academy of Arts, Sofia. With the establishment of the Bezalel Academy in 1906, Levi immigrated to the Land of Israel at the invitation of Boris Schatz. While at the Academy, Levi organized the first choir at Bezalel.

Levi spoke of the praise he was given as well as the financial reward which resulted from his exhibition in Czarist Russia. This success allowed him to study in the Académie Julian, Paris in 1913. While in Paris he participated in the French "Orientalist" exhibition. Upon his return to the Land of Israel, at the start of the First World War, Levi was active in the local art scene. In 1920, Levi was among the founders of the Jewish Artist Association and chaired their first committee. In 1921, Levi was the founder and in charge of the Zionist Tourist Association of Sofia. On 18 April 1927, he opened an exhibition of his works in the house of Yosef Eliyahu Chelouche in Tel Aviv. In 1931, he exhibited in the Galerie Sélection in France.

Levi was among the founders of the Beit Haam (see Hebrew article מרכז ז'ראר בכר) in Jerusalem and decorated the building with painted walls and ceilings. 
In 1960, there was a retrospective exhibition of his works at the Tel Aviv Museum and at the Jerusalem Artists House. His artwork is found among the collections of many museums including the Musée du Luxembourg, Paris.

Education 
 1901-1905 National Academy of Arts, Sofia
 1906 Bezalel Academy
 1913 Académie Julian, Paris

Teaching 
 Bezalel Academy
 Hebrew Teachers' College
 Herzliya Hebrew Gymnasium, Jerusalem
 Lemmel Elementary School, Jerusalem

Exhibitions
 1912 exhibition in Czarist Russia
 1914 "Orientalist" Association exhibition in Paris
 1921 Participated in the first annual international exhibition of the Jewish Artist Association at the Tower of David
 1927 exhibition at the house of Yosef Eliyahu Chelouche, Tel Aviv
 1931 exhibited in the Galerie Sélection in France
 1960 retrospective exhibition, the Tel Aviv Museum and at the Jerusalem Artists House

Further reading 
 Shmuel Levi: Retrospective Exhibition, Tel-Aviv Museum, September 1960
 Amnon Barzel, Art in Israel, 1987

References

External links 
 

Bezalel Academy of Arts and Design alumni
1884 births
1966 deaths
Artists from Sofia
Bulgarian Jews in Israel
20th-century Israeli painters
Bulgarian emigrants to the Ottoman Empire
Israeli people of Bulgarian-Jewish descent
Date of death missing